Konstantinos Georgiadis (born 17 January 1980) is a Greek professional football manager and former player.

References

1980 births
Living people
Footballers from Thessaloniki
Greek footballers
Association football midfielders
ILTEX Lykoi F.C. players
Ergotelis F.C. players
Veria F.C. players
Agrotikos Asteras F.C. players
Makedonikos F.C. players
Anagennisi Epanomi F.C. players
Greek football managers
Agrotikos Asteras F.C. managers
Veria NFC managers
Iraklis Thessaloniki F.C. managers